Summerbridge may refer to:

Summerbridge, North Yorkshire, village in England
Breakthrough Collaborative, formerly Summerbridge National, educational programs in USA and Hong Kong